Catasticta lisa is a butterfly in the family Pieridae found in Peru. The species was first described by Baumann and Reissinger in 1969.

References

External links 
 Catasticta lisa Baumann & Reissinger, 1969-Type Specimens

Pierini
Butterflies described in 1969